Christine and the Storks  is an East German film. It was released in 1962.

External links
 

1962 films
East German films
1960s German-language films
1960s German films